The 1904 Illinois lieutenant gubernatorial election was held on November 8, 1904. It saw the election of Republican nominee Lawrence Y. Sherman.

Democratic nomination

Candidates
Thomas F. Ferns of Jerseyville, former State Representative

Results

Republican nomination

Candidates
W. J. Conzelman, of Pekin, President of the Peoria Railway Terminal Company (withdrew during ballot)
Lawrence Y. Sherman of Macomb, State Representative 
Frank L. Smith of Dwight

Results

Following the ballot, Smith withdrew his name and moved that the nomination of Sherman be made unanimous, which was carried.

General election

See also
1904 Illinois gubernatorial election

References

Bibliography

lieutenant gubernaotiral
1904
Illinois
November 1904 events